The Taiping Prison (formerly known as Larut Prison and Taiping Training Centre) was established in 1879 and is the first and oldest modern prison complex in Malaysia. It was also the largest prison complex at the time. In 1881 Sikh warders were brought in to assist Malay warders and vocational trainers were brought in from Hong Kong to introduce useful industry in the prison.

History

In 1882 there was an exercise to place prison inmates into categories. In 1889 a European warder was appointed. With the establishment of the Federate Malay States, Taiping Prison became the detention centre for prisoners with long sentences from Perak, Pahang, Negri Sembilan and Selangor. In 1923 the system of "Visiting Justices" was introduced. Prison industry had been developed and included printing works, cloth production, sewing and rattan and ironworking. In 1924 stoneworking was halted and replaced with coconut dehusking. In World War II, during the Japanese occupation (1941-1945), Taiping Prison was used as a public prison and also a Japanese prisoner-of-war detention centre. It was during this period that all records about the prison and its inmates were destroyed.

The prison still operates to this day as Penjara Taiping.

References

Prisons in Malaysia
History of Perak
British Malaya
British colonial prisons in Asia
Buildings and structures in Perak
1879 establishments in the British Empire